Pan IBJJF Jiu-Jitsu No-Gi Championship  is a no-gi Brazilian Jiu-Jitsu  tournament held annually by the  International Brazilian Jiu-Jitsu Federation (IBJJF).

List of Pan Jiu-Jitsu No-Gi Champions in Adult Male Black Belt division, by Year and Weight

List of Pan Jiu-Jitsu No-Gi Champions in Adult Female Black Belt Women's division, by Year and Weight

See also 
 IBJJF
 World Championship
 World No-Gi Championship
 Pan Jiu-Jitsu Championship
 European Open Championship
 European Open Nogi Championship
 Brazilian National Jiu-Jitsu Championship
 Brazilian Nationals Jiu-Jitsu No-Gi Championship
 Asian Open Championship
 ADCC Submission Fighting World Championship

References

External links 
 Official site

Brazilian jiu-jitsu competitions
Jiu Jitsu
No-Gi Brazilian jiu-jitsu competitions